Paulin is a French masculine given name and surname.

People with the surname Paulin
Donald Paulin, American businessman and politician
Georges Paulin (1902–42), French car designer and wartime resistance fighter
Scott Paulin (born 1950), American actor and television director
Tom Paulin (born 1949), Northern Irish poet and critic
Viveca Paulin (born 1969), Swedish actress

People with the given name Paulin
Paulin Bordeleau (born 1953), Canadian ice hockey player
Paulin Dhëmbi (born 1979), Albanian footballer
Paulin Freitas (1909–1989), Togolese politician
Jean-Baptiste Paulin Guérin (1783–1855), French painter
Paulin J. Hountondji (born 1942), Beninese politician
Paulin Joachim (born 1931), Beninese journalist
Paulin Tokala Kombe (born 1977), Congolese footballer
Paulin Lemaire (1882-?), French gymnast
Paulin Martin (1840–1890), French Biblical scholar
Paulin de Milan, aka Paulinus the Deacon, 5th century notary
Paulin Obame-Nguema (born 1934), former Prime Minister of Gabon
Alexis Paulin Paris (1800–1881), French scholar
Paulin Pomodimo (born 1954), Archbishop in the Central African Republic
Paulin Soumanou Vieyra (1925–1987), Benin/Senegal film director and historian
Paulin Voavy (born 1987), Malagasy footballer

See also
Paulin (disambiguation)